Umar Pulavar Tamil Language Centre, formerly known as St George’s Road Tamil Language Centre, is an academic institution for teaching Tamil language in Singapore. 

After the closure of Umar Pulavar Tamil High School in 1982, St George’s Road Tamil Language Centre was renamed as Umar Pulavar Tamil Language Centre in 1983 to preserve the name of the high school.

The centre offers the Tamil language elective programme under the National Elective Tamil Programme by the Ministry of Education.

References

External links
 Official website of Umar Pulavar Tamil Language Centre

Language education in Singapore
Language schools in Singapore
Tamil-language education
Kallang